40+ is a 2019 Maldivian horror comedy film written and directed by Yoosuf Shafeeu and the sequel to his previous comedy film Naughty 40 (2017). Produced by Ismail Shafeeq under Eupe Productions, the film stars Yoosuf Shafeeu, Mohamed Manik, Ahmed Saeed and Ali Seezan reprising their role as Ashwanee, Ahsan, Ajwad and Zahid respectively. Fathimath Azifa and Ali Azim were also retained their in the sequel, while Sheela Najeeb, Mohamed Faisal, Ahmed Easa, Mariyam Shakeela, and Mariyam Shifa were added to the cast. The film is scheduled to release on 5 March 2019.

Cast 
 Yoosuf Shafeeu as Ashvani
 Ali Seezan as Zahidh
 Mohamed Manik as Ajwad
 Ahmed Saeed as Ahsan
 Sheela Najeeb as Zarifa
 Fathimath Azifa as Thaniya
 Mohamed Faisal as Akram
 Ali Azim as Nadheem
 Ahmed Easa as Saiman
 Mariyam Shakeela as Gumeyra
 Ali Shahid as Zubeiru
 Mariyam Shifa as Laila
 Irufana Ibrahim as Shamra
 Hunaisha Adam Naseer as Mishka
 Aminath Ziyadha as Fazna
 Aishath Sam'aa as Shaira
 Ahmed Bassam as Fairooz
 Mariyam Azza in the item number   "Lailaa" (Special appearance)

Development
A sequel to Yoosuf Shafeeu's commercially successful comedy film Naughty 40 (2017) was announced on 31 October 2017. Despite its prequel being a comedy film, the spin off was reported to include horror elements in the film, marking the first of its genre; horror comedy, in Maldivian film industry. It was believed that the film will retain majority of the cast from its prequel with inclusion of additional actors including Sheela Najeeb, Mohamed Faisal and Mariyam Shifa. A casting call was opened on 3 December 2017 to an "overwhelming" response which resulted in five new faces to join the cast post audition of over hundred candidates. Filming was commenced on 23 December 2017 in Th. Burunee scheduled to be completed within twenty five days. Shooting of the film was completed on 21 January 2018.

Soundtrack

Release
The film was initially planned to release on 1 August 2018 though they pushed the release date to the following year citing the political instability in the country in relation to 2018 Maldivian presidential election. The trailer of the film was released on 24 November 2018 while announcing the release date as 27 February 2019. However, it was again postponed to 5 March 2019 since the Olympus was being occupied during the period for an event organized by National Centre for the Arts.

References

2019 films
2019 comedy horror films
Maldivian comedy horror films
Films directed by Yoosuf Shafeeu
Dhivehi-language films